The 2018 Men's European Volleyball League was the 15th edition of the annual Men's European Volleyball League, which featured men's national volleyball teams from twenty European countries.
Unlike previous seasons, the tournament had two groups: the Golden League, featuring twelve teams, and the Silver League, featuring eight teams.

It also acted as the European qualifying competition for the 2018 FIVB Volleyball Men's Challenger Cup, securing two vacancies for the tournament that then served as the qualifying competition for the 2019 FIVB Volleyball Men's Nations League.

Pools composition

Golden League

Silver League

League round
All times are local.

Golden League
The Golden League Final Round hosts Czech Republic and the winners of each pool will qualify for the Golden League Final Round. If Czech Republic finishes first in Pool C, the best second team among all pools will qualify for the Golden League Final Round.

Pool A

|}

|}

Pool B

|}

|}

Pool C

|}

|}

Silver League
The Silver League Final Round hosts Macedonia, the winners of each pool and the best second team among all pools will qualify for the Silver League Final Round.

Pool A

|}

|}

Pool B 

|}

|}

Final round

Silver League
Venue:  Boris Trajkovski Sports Center, Skopje, Macedonia
All times are Central European Summer Time (UTC+02:00).

Semifinals

|}

3rd place match

|}

Final

|}

Golden League
Venue:  KV Arena, Karlovy Vary, Czech Republic
All times are Central European Summer Time (UTC+02:00).

Semifinals

|}

3rd place match

|}

Final

|}

Final standing

Awards 

Most Valuable Player
 Renee Teppan
Best Setter
 Kert Toobal
Best Outside Spikers
 Oliver Venno
 Donovan Džavoronok

Best Middle Blockers
 Vahit Emre Savas
 Andri Aganits
Best Opposite Spiker
 Michal Finger
Best Libero
 Milan Monik

See also
2018 Women's European Volleyball League

References

External links
Official website of the Golden League
Official website of the Silver League

European Volleyball League
Europe
2018 FIVB Volleyball Men's Challenger Cup qualification
2018 in Czech sport
International volleyball competitions hosted by the Czech Republic
May 2018 sports events in Europe
June 2018 sports events in Europe